Dr. Zakir Hussain College, established in 1970, is a general degree college located in Ilayangudi town of Sivagangai District. The college is affiliated with Alagappa University. This college offers different courses in arts, commerce and science.

Accreditation
The college is  recognized by the University Grants Commission (UGC).

See also
Education in India
Literacy in India
Zakir Husain (politician)
List of educational institutions in Sivagangai district
List of institutions of higher education in Tamil Nadu

References

External links

Colleges in India
Education in Sivaganga district
1970 establishments in Tamil Nadu
Colleges affiliated to Alagappa University